The Asia/Oceania Zone was the unique zone within Group 4 of the regional Davis Cup competition in 2017. The zone's competition was held in round robin format in Isa Town, Bahrain, from 3 April to 8 April 2017. The two winning nations won promotion to Group III, Asia/Oceania Zone, for 2018.

Participating nations

Inactive nations

Draw
Date: 3–8 April

Location: Bahrain Polytechnic, Isa Town, Bahrain (hard)

Format: Round-robin basis. Two pools of five and six teams, respectively (Pools A and B). The winner of each pool plays off against the runner-up of the other pool to determine which two nations are promoted to Asia/Oceania Zone Group III in 2018.

Seeding: The seeding was based on the Davis Cup Rankings of 20 February 2017 (shown in parentheses below).

Pool A 

Standings are determined by: 1. number of wins; 2. number of matches; 3. in two-team ties, head-to-head records; 4. in three-team ties, (a) percentage of sets won (head-to-head records if two teams remain tied), then (b) percentage of games won (head-to-head records if two teams remain tied), then (c) Davis Cup rankings.

Pool B 

Standings are determined by: 1. number of wins; 2. number of matches; 3. in two-team ties, head-to-head records; 4. in three-team ties, (a) percentage of sets won (head-to-head records if two teams remain tied), then (b) percentage of games won (head-to-head records if two teams remain tied), then (c) Davis Cup rankings.

Playoffs 

 and  promoted to Group III in 2018.

Round robin

Pool A

Cambodia vs. Myanmar

Bahrain vs. Saudi Arabia

Cambodia vs. Kyrgyzstan

Bahrain vs. Myanmar

Cambodia vs. Bahrain

Saudi Arabia vs. Kyrgyzstan

Bahrain vs. Kyrgyzstan

Saudi Arabia vs. Myanmar

Cambodia vs. Saudi Arabia

Myanmar vs. Kyrgyzstan

Pool B

Iraq vs. Mongolia

Singapore vs. Tajikistan

Bangladesh vs. Oman

Iraq vs. Tajikistan

Singapore vs. Oman

Bangladesh vs. Mongolia

Iraq vs. Oman

Singapore vs. Bangladesh

Tajikistan vs. Mongolia

Iraq vs. Bangladesh

Singapore vs. Mongolia

Oman vs. Tajikistan

Iraq vs. Singapore

Bangladesh vs. Tajikistan

Oman vs. Mongolia

Playoffs

Promotional playoffs

Cambodia vs. Oman

Singapore vs. Saudi Arabia

5th place playoff

Myanmar vs. Mongolia

7th place playoff

Bahrain vs. Tajikistan

9th place playoff

Bangladesh vs. Kyrgyzstan

References

External links
Official Website

Asia/Oceania Zone Group IV
Davis Cup Asia/Oceania Zone